Tesnatee is an unincorporated community in White County, in the U.S. state of Georgia.

History
A post office called Tesnatee was established in 1880, and remained in operation until 1905. The community takes its name from nearby Tesnatee Creek. Variant names were "Tessantee" and "Tosnata".

References

Unincorporated communities in Georgia (U.S. state)
Unincorporated communities in White County, Georgia